Bimbo was a British comic book magazine aimed at children in nursery school. It ran from 1961 until 1972 and was published by D.C. Thomson & Co. The magazine was named after its main feature Bimbo, which was a comic strip about a little boy.

The magazine was comparable to the magazine Little Star. Bimbo annuals continued to be published until the 1980s.

Characters
 Bimbo drawn by Bob Dewar
 Tom Thumb drawn by Dudley D. Watkins from early issues of The Beano
 Patsy The Panda from the little girl's comic Twinkle.
 Beezer star Baby Crockett drawn by Bill Ritchie

References

DC Thomson Comics titles
Comics magazines published in the United Kingdom
Children's magazines published in the United Kingdom
1961 comics debuts
1972 comics endings
Defunct British comics
Magazines established in 1961
Magazines disestablished in 1972
British comic strips
British comics characters
Child characters in comics
Magazine mascots
Male characters in comics
Male characters in advertising
Mascots introduced in 1961